Sri Sai Janmasthan Temple (Sai Baba Birth Temple) is a temple in Pathri city of Parbhani district of Maharashtra, India where Indian spiritual master Sai Baba of Shirdi was born.

History
In 1970s, a field research established that Sai Baba was born in Pathri village. Sri Sai Smarak Samiti (Sai Memorial committee) was then formed in Pathri. A committee purchased land for temple on site of Sai Baba's house and construction of the temple was started in 1994. In 1999 the temple was inaugurated to the public.

See also
 Sai Baba of Shirdi

References

Tourist attractions in Parbhani district
Hindu temples in Maharashtra
Sai Baba of Shirdi